Garga Samhita is the title of several Sanskrit-language texts:

 Garga-samhita (Garga and Kraushtuki), a 1st century CE astrological treatise, also known as Garga-jyotisha
 Garga-samhita (Garga and Bharadvaja), a 6th-7th century astrological and astronomical treatise
 Garga Samhita (Vaishnavite text), an account of the life of Radha Krishna